Rodney Morris (born 25 November 1970 in Anaheim, California, USA) is a professional pool player of Chamorro - Hawaiian descent. Nicknamed "Rocket" he currently resides in Acworth, Georgia. Rodney married his wife Rheyannon in July 2020.

Career
In 1996, Morris won his first major tournament by defeating Efren Reyes in the finals of the US Open Nine-ball Championship. In 2001, after 5 years of not playing in a tournament Morris came back to win the Sands Regency 9-Ball Open.
In 2003, he was on top form and dominated the World Pool League tournament, besting Thorsten Hohmann the reigning World Champion.

He has represented Team USA in the Mosconi Cup on eight occasions. He was the Mosconi Cup MVP in 2004.

As a member of the International Pool Tour (IPT), in July 2006 he was runner-up to Efren Reyes in the inaugural IPT World Open Eight-ball Championship which was held in Reno, Nevada. While Reyes earned $500K for first place, Morris won $150K for second.

In July 2007, Rodney Morris was designated as the United Pool Players Association (UPA) Lead Player Representative.  The UPA is the men's governing body of professional pool in the United States.

In 2008, Rodney won the World Cup of Pool in Rotterdam, Netherlands.

Career titles
 1994 Capital City 9-Ball Open 
 1996 Grand Prix de Puerto Rico
 1996 U.S. Open 9-ball Championship
 2001 Sands Regency 9-Ball Open
 2002 Hard Times 9-Ball Division  
 2003 World Pool League 
 2003 Mosconi Cup 
 2004 Breakers Open 9-Ball Event 
 2004 Sands Regency 9-Ball Open
 2004 Seminole Florida Pro Tour Stop  
 2004 Corpus Christi Classic 
 2004 Houston Open
 2004 World All Stars Invitational Team Cup 
 2004 Mosconi Cup 
 2004 Mosconi Cup (MVP) 
 2005 Mosconi Cup 
 2006 Andy Grubbs Memorial 9 Ball 
 2006 UPA Pro Tour Championship 
 2006 Seminole Florida Pro Tour Stop  
 2007 SE Open 9-Ball Tour Stop  
 2007 Steve Mizerak 10-Ball Championship
 2008 World Cup of Pool - with (Shane Van Boening)
 2008 Quezon City Invasion
 2010 Seminole Pro Tour Stop
 2010 Poison Doubles 8-ball Championships 
 2010 Seminole Pro Tour Stop
 2011 Derby City Classic 10-ball Challenge
 2011 Interpool Open 9-ball
 2011 Turning Stone Classic XVII 
 2011 Chuck Markulis Memorial 9-Ball Division
 2011 Seminole Pro Tour Stop
 2012 Wyoming 9-Ball Open
 2013 CSI U.S. Open 10-ball Championship
 2014 Cole Dickson Memorial
 2015 Super 32 10-Ball Championship
 2015 Chinook Winds Open 10-Ball Open Division
 2016 Don Coates Memorial 9-Ball
 2016 Billiard Congress of America Hall of Fame

References

External links
 Player Profile
 Upcoming match
 Industry profile of Rodney Morris
 Rodney Morris interview from the official 2006 Mosconi Cup website 

American pool players
1970 births
Living people
World Games bronze medalists

Competitors at the 2005 World Games